The 2006 DFL-Ligapokal Final decided the winner of the 2006 DFL-Ligapokal, the 10th edition of the reiterated DFL-Ligapokal, a knockout football cup competition.

The match was played on 5 August 2006 at the Zentralstadion in Leipzig. Werder Bremen won the match 2–0 against Bayern Munich for their 1st title.

Teams
In the following table, finals until 2004 were in the DFB-Ligapokal era, since 2005 were in the DFL-Ligapokal era.

Route to the final
The DFL-Ligapokal is a six team single-elimination knockout cup competition. There are a total of two rounds leading up to the final. Four teams enter the preliminary round, with the two winners advancing to the semi-finals, where they will be joined by two additional clubs who were given a bye. For all matches, the winner after 90 minutes advances. If still tied, extra time, and if necessary penalties are used to determine the winner.

Match

Details

References

2006
SV Werder Bremen matches
FC Bayern Munich matches
2006–07 in German football cups